Central Suffolk was a county constituency in the county of Suffolk.  It returned one Member of Parliament (MP) to the House of Commons of the Parliament of the United Kingdom.

History 
The constituency was created for the 1983 general election, primarily from the abolished county constituency of Eye, including the town of Stowmarket.  It also included four wards from the north-western part of the Borough of Ipswich, transferred from the Borough Constituency thereof, and a small rural area to the west, equivalent to the former Rural District of Thedwastre, transferred from Bury St Edmunds.

It was in turn replaced by the Central Suffolk and North Ipswich constituency for the 1997 general election with a substantial area of the constituency, including Stowmarket, joining a reconfigured Bury St Edmunds constituency.

Boundaries 
The District of Mid Suffolk, and the Borough of Ipswich wards of Broom Hill, Castle Hill, Whitehouse, and Whitton.

Members of Parliament

Elections

Elections in the 1980s

Elections in the 1990s

Notes and references 

Parliamentary constituencies in Suffolk (historic)
Constituencies of the Parliament of the United Kingdom established in 1983
Constituencies of the Parliament of the United Kingdom disestablished in 1997